Darpa is a genus of spread-wingedskippers in the family Hesperiidae. Their distribution is restricted to the Indomalayan realm.

Species
Recognised species in the genus Darpa include: 
 Darpa dealbata  (Distant, 1886)
 Darpa hanria Moore, 1865 
 Darpa pteria (Hewitson, 1868)
 Darpa striata Druce, 1873
 Darpa inopinata Devyatkin, 2001

References

Natural History Museum Lepidoptera genus database

External links
Images representing Darpa  at  Consortium for the Barcode of Life
Darpa  Moore, 1866 at Markku Savela's Lepidoptera and Some Other Life Forms

Tagiadini
Hesperiidae genera
Taxa named by Frederic Moore